Myron Lewis (born November 24, 1987) is a former American football cornerback. He was drafted by the Tampa Bay Buccaneers in the third round of the 2010 NFL Draft. Lewis played college football at Vanderbilt University, where he garnered SEC honors his junior and senior years.

Professional career

Tampa Bay Buccaneers
Lewis was selected 67th overall in the 2010 NFL Draft by the Tampa Bay Buccaneers. On August 8, 2013, Lewis was waived by the Buccaneers.

Detroit Lions
On August 11, 2013, Lewis was signed by the Detroit Lions. On August 25, 2013, he was cut by the Detroit Lions.

Las Vegas Outlaws
On January 30, 2015, Lewis was assigned to the Las Vegas Outlaws of the Arena Football League (AFL).

Hudson Valley Fort
In the fall of 2015, Lewis signed with the Hudson Valley Fort of the Fall Experimental Football League (FXFL).

Arizona Rattlers
On October 16, 2015, Lewis was assigned to the Arizona Rattlers. On November 11, 2015, Lewis was placed on recallable reassignment.

References

External links
Vanderbilt Commodores biography
ESPN college stats
Tampa Bay Buccaneers page
Edmonton Eskimos bio

1987 births
Living people
American football cornerbacks
American football safeties
Detroit Lions players
Edmonton Elks players
Players of American football from Orlando, Florida
Players of Canadian football from Orlando, Florida
Lewis, Myron
Tampa Bay Buccaneers players
Vanderbilt Commodores football players
Blacktips (FXFL) players
Las Vegas Outlaws (arena football) players
Hudson Valley Fort players
Arizona Rattlers players